The 1965 Conservative Party leadership election was held in July 1965 to find a successor to Alec Douglas-Home.

It was the first time that a formal election by the parliamentary party had taken place, previous leaders having emerged through a consultation process.  This procedure had fallen into disrepute following the manoeuvrings over the leadership at the 1963 party conference which had led to the appointment of Douglas-Home, then a hereditary member of the House of Lords. The plans for how the election would work were published in February 1965, and agreed upon by the parliamentary party thereafter.

Election campaign
Former Prime Minister Alec Douglas-Home triggered the election on 23 July 1965, by resigning at a full meeting of the 1922 Committee in committee room 14.

It was widely assumed that both Edward Heath, Shadow Chancellor, and Reginald Maudling, Shadow Foreign Secretary, would stand. Members of the "magic circle" of old Etonians chose not to contend the election, with widespread agreement that a younger and modern face was needed to front the Conservative Party.

Another potential "modernizing" candidate, Iain Macleod, ruled himself out immediately. He might have received 40-45 votes had he stood, but he instead endorsed Heath.

Other names that were seen as possible contenders were Quintin Hogg, Peter Thorneycroft and Enoch Powell, Shadow Transport Minister (who eventually did stand). Some were angered by Powell's candidature, as a complication in an otherwise clear contest.

Maudling, the most experienced and publicly known of the candidates, was generally considered to be the favourite. Heath's prospects were seen as either tie-ing or preventing Maudling from reaching the 15% lead needed to win outright. It was also thought that Powell would take support away from Heath whose backers predominantly came from northern England and industrial cities (such as Birmingham and Wolverhampton), as opposed to Maudling's geographically wider support. Heath, however, fought a more effective leadership campaign, organised by his young lieutenant Peter Walker, and by the eve of the election, the Heath camp believed they had a clear lead. Maudling, by contrast, fought a lacklustre campaign. He assumed, for example, that William Whitelaw would vote for him, but he voted for Heath.

The election was managed by the Chairman of the 1922 Committee, Sir William Anstruther-Gray. The result of the ballot on 27 July was as follows:

The rules in place required the victor to have both an absolute majority (which Heath had narrowly achieved) and, in the first ballot, at least a 15% lead of votes actually cast (not counting abstaining members - this would be changed in the mid 1970s review of the rules). As Heath had not achieved the latter hurdle, the election could therefore have gone to further rounds. However, Maudling conceded defeat and Heath was duly declared leader.

Powell had not expected to win, but said he had "left his visiting card", i.e. publicly demonstrated himself to be a potential future leader. However, the 1965 leadership contest showed Powell's lack of support in the Parliamentary Party, and thereafter Heath felt able to call his bluff. In 1968 he was sacked from the Conservative front bench for the "Rivers of Blood speech", although he held great sway over public opinion in the following years. However, by the next time a leadership vote was held (in 1975) he had become an Ulster Unionist and so was no longer eligible to stand.

Notes

References

External links
 

1965
Conservative Party leadership election
Conservative Party leadership election
Conservative Party leadership election
Edward Heath